ReadyMade (or Ready Made) was a California, United States, bimonthly magazine which focused on do-it-yourself (DIY) projects involving interior design, making furniture, home improvement, sewing, metalworking, woodworking and other disciplines. It also focused on sustainable design, independent music and DIY culture. The magazine was marketed to people who enjoy creating unique items to have at home and wear and featured projects which could often be completed with everyday materials, such as household items.

History
ReadyMade was founded by chief editor Shoshana Berger and publisher Grace Hawthorne in Berkeley, California. The inaugural issue was published in Winter 2002, with quarterly issues produced until the magazine moved to bimonthly issues with the March/April 2004 publication. In 2006, the Meredith Corporation purchased the magazine. In January 2009, Meredith announced it was relocating the magazine's creative staff to Des Moines, Iowa due to company-wide budgetary concerns (though the ReadyMade title itself was reportedly successful). None of the editorial staff chose to relocate, and Better Homes and Gardens executive editor Kitty Morgan assumed editorial duties for ReadyMade on an interim basis. On June 16, 2011, ReadyMade announced on its blog that Meredith had discontinued the magazine.

Subjects
Unlike more traditional home improvement magazines and how-to books, ReadyMade'''s projects were aimed at a younger (21–39) audience. Projects in their issues included:
 making a lamp out of a cd spindle
 altering a car stereo to accept an iPod input jack
 instructions on how to run for local office in the United States
 recycling broken speakers to become light fixtures, coffee tables, or bookcases

and similar projects with an emphasis on creating an urban indie aesthetic.

DemographicReadyMade'' was aimed at the emerging DIY culture in North America that enjoys not only the fashion of handmade items and interior design, but also the philosophy and politics inherent in recycling, DIY attire, and ecology. The ads featured in the magazine targeted a largely liberal readership interested in locally produced, handmade, ecological, and organic goods, but also featured ads from companies such as PF Flyers shoes, Urban Outfitters, and similar corporations looking to appeal to a young hipster audience. The music featured in the articles was generally independent rock, featuring such artists' own DIY projects, such as an article where The Flaming Lips showed how to make a mock space station out of junkyard parts.

References

 Susan Fornoff (June 2006). AT HOME WITH THE READYMADES / Reuse. Recycle. Reinvent. DIY magazine founders Shoshana Berger and Grace Hawthorne share a lifestyle philosophy. But their day-to-days are vastly different. SF Chronicle.
 IIT Institute (August 2015). Article on ReadyMade and the maker movement - Interview with Grace Hawthorne

External links
 ReadyMade book review in the New York Times
 At Home with the ReadyMades in the SF Chronicle
 Charles and Hudson interview with co-founder and editor-in-chief Shoshana Berger

2001 establishments in California
2011 disestablishments in Iowa
Bimonthly magazines published in the United States
Defunct magazines published in the United States
DIY culture
Hobby magazines published in the United States
Magazines established in 2001
Magazines disestablished in 2011
Magazines published in California
Magazines published in Iowa
Mass media in Des Moines, Iowa
Defunct Meredith Corporation magazines
Mass media in Berkeley, California